Marignana is a commune in the Corse-du-Sud department of France on the island of Corsica.

Geography

Climate

Marignana has a hot-summer Mediterranean climate (Köppen climate classification Csa).

Population

See also
Communes of the Corse-du-Sud department

References

Communes of Corse-du-Sud
Corse-du-Sud communes articles needing translation from French Wikipedia